Vasileios Goudas (c. 1779 – 1845 ) was a fighter of the Greek War of Independence and an officer of the Greek Army from Epirus.

Biography
Goudas was born in Ioannina or  around 1779. He took part in the Greek War of Independence, being closely associated with the Souliot clan of Botsaris. At first he served as a secretary and adjutant of Markos Botsaris and he fought in several battles under Botsaris' command. In 1823 he oversaw on behalf of the revolutionary government the liquidation of the assets following the requisition of an Italian ship, which resulted in proceeds of 8000 kuruş. After Markos Botsaris' death, Goudas served as secretary of his brother Kostas Botsaris.

In September 1824, after the report of Kostas Botsaris that described very positively Goudas’ contribution to the revolution so far, the latter was promoted to chiliarch. In early January 1826, he went to the headquarters of the Legislative Corps in Nafplio as envoy of the guard of the monastery of Mega Spilaion which was under the leadership of Tousias Botsaris.

From late 1827 until mid-1828, because of a serious health problem, Goudas, starting from the Ionian Islands, travelled to various European cities (Ancona, Pisa, Marseilles, Geneva, Paris, etc.) meeting various important people of the time like Ioannis Kapodistrias, Metropolitan Ignatius of Hungary-Wallachia, the French General Lafayette and Jean-Gabriel Eynard.

Vasileios Goudas died in Athens in 1845 having the military rank of Lieutenant. His brother, Stavros Goudas, was a fighter of the Revolution as well, but later he became a monk. His nephew was the doctor, writer and politician Anastasios Goudas.

References

Bibliography
Nikolaos Spiliadis, Απομνημονεύματα, Εκ του Τυπογραφείου Χ. Ν. Φιλαδελφέως, Αθήνησιν, 1851.
Σύγχρονος Εγκυκλοπαίδεια Ελευθερουδάκη, vol.7.
Περιοδικό Ζωσιμάδες, issue 43.

Sources
Αρχεία της Ελληνικής Παλιγγενεσίας, Έκδοσις της Βιβλιοθήκης της Βουλής των Ελλήνων, vol. 7, 10, 13.
Γενική Εφημερίς της Ελλάδος, 30 June 1828.

External links
Vassilis Goudas: Brief Biography, by the Institute for Neohellenic Research

1779 births
1845 deaths
Greek people of the Greek War of Independence
People from Ioannina (regional unit)